Discodoris branneri is a species of sea slug, a dorid nudibranch, shell-less marine gastropod mollusks in the family Discodorididae.

Distribution
The distribution of Discodoris branneri includes Florida, Texas, Costa Rica, Honduras, Panama, Colombia, Venezuela, Bahamas, Cayman Islands, Puerto Rico, Jamaica, Barbados, Martinique, St. Lucia, Guadeloupe, St. Vincent and the Grenadines, Brazil.

Description 

The body is oval, moderately rigid. Dorsum is covered by numerous conical tubercles. Background color is variable, from cream to purplish brown, sometimes with black or white patches and spots. Rhinophores and gill are usually the same color as the dorsum with white tips. The maximum recorded length is 110 mm.

Habitat 
Minimum recorded depth is 0 m; maximum recorded depth is 7 m. It was found under rocks in Panama. Members of this family feed on sponges.

When disturbed, this species autotomizes parts of the mantle.

References
This article incorporates Creative Commons (CC-BY-4.0) text from the reference

Discodorididae
Gastropods described in 1909